This is a list of vice presidents (post-1947 constitution) of the Republic of China by other offices (either elected or appointive) held, either before or after service as the vice president.

Central government

Executive branch

Presidents 

In addition, Li Zongren acted as president from 21 January 1949 to 1 March 1950 on Chiang Kai-shek's declaration of incapacity.

Executive Yuan Ministers

Ambassadors

Legislative branch

National Assembly

Legislative Yuan 

These future vice presidents served in the Legislative Yuan together:
Wu Den-yih served with William Lai (2002–2009).

Local government

Governors and Mayors of Special Municipalities

Provincial or City Councillors

Other provincial or municipal offices

Magistrates and Mayors of County-level Units

Military

Lost races

Presidential elections

Local elections

References

Republic of China
Lists of Taiwanese politicians